An election to the Isle of Anglesey County Council was held as part of the 2013 United Kingdom local elections and took place on 2 May 2013. Anglesey was the only Welsh authority voting in 2013, the election having been postponed from 2012 by the Welsh Government, in order to allow an electoral review to take place. The next full council election took place on 4 May 2017.

Boundary review

Under The Isle of Anglesey (Electoral Arrangements) Order 2012, thirty seats (a reduction from the previous 40) were created, from eleven (previously 40) electoral divisions, by the Local Government Boundary Commission for Wales.

Overall results
Turnout for the election was 50.5% of eligible voters. Independent councillors won more seats than any other group, but Plaid Cymru made strong gains, saying they would find it difficult to work with the independent group and hoped to form an alliance with Labour. The island's Returning Officer described democracy on the island as being "invigorated".

Results by ward

Aethwy

Bro Aberffraw

Bro Rhosyr

Caergybi

Canolbarth Môn

Llifôn

Lligwy

Seiriol

Talybolion

Twrcelyn

Ynys Gybi

References

2013
2013 Welsh local elections